This is a list of the seasons played by FC Nantes, from their entry into the Championnat de France Division 2 in 1945 until the present day. The club's achievements in all major national and international competitions are listed.

Nantes has been very successful in domestic competitions, winning eight French top division titles. The club is also four-time winners of the Coupe de France and three-time winners of the Trophée des Champions, and won the Coupe de la Ligue in 1965. Since 1945, Nantes has spent 54 seasons in Ligue 1/Division 1, including 44 consecutive seasons between 1963 and 2007. The club has spent the remaining 23 seasons of their existence in Ligue 2/Division 2, having never been relegated below this level. They have been relegated only twice in their history, in 2007 and 2009.

A Nantes player has finished as top scorer in the top division on six occasions. These are listed in bold in the table below.

FC Nantes (1945–92)

FC Nantes Atlantique (1992–07)

FC Nantes (2007–present)

References

FC Nantes
FC Nantes
French football club statistics